The 1973 Humboldt State Lumberjacks football team represented Humboldt State University during the 1973 NCAA Division II football season. Humboldt State competed in the Far Western Conference (FWC).

The 1973 Lumberjacks were led by eighth-year head coach Bud Van Deren. They played home games at the Redwood Bowl in Arcata, California. Humboldt State finished with a record of two wins, six losses and two ties (2–6–2, 1–4 FWC). The Lumberjacks were outscored by their opponents 123–212 for the season.

Schedule

Team players in the NFL
The following Humboldt State players were selected in the 1974 NFL Draft.

The following finished their college career in 1973, were not drafted, but played in the NFL.

Notes

References

Humboldt State
Humboldt State Lumberjacks football seasons
Humboldt State Lumberjacks football